This article lists the colonial governors of Cameroon. It encompasses the period when the country was under colonial rule of the German Empire (as Kamerun), military occupation of the territory by the Allies of World War I (during the Kamerun campaign of the African theatre), as well as the period when it was a Class B League of Nations mandate and a United Nation trust territory, under the administration of France (as French Cameroon) and the United Kingdom (as British Cameroon) respectively.

List

(Dates in italics indicate de facto continuation of office)

Kamerun

Allied occupation of German Cameroon

French Cameroon

British Cameroon

For continuation after independence, see: List of presidents of Cameroon

See also
Cameroon
Politics of Cameroon
President of Cameroon
List of presidents of Cameroon
Prime Minister of Cameroon
List of prime ministers of Cameroon
List of heads of government of French Cameroon
List of heads of government of British Cameroons
Lists of office-holders

External links
World Statesmen – Cameroon

Governors
Colonial governors
Cameroon
Cameroon